Feistritz ob Bleiburg is a town in the district of Völkermarkt in the Austrian state of Carinthia.

History
In the Carinthian Plebiscite of 1920, Sankt Jakob was one of the 17 Carinthian municipalities, where the majority of the population (65%) voted for the annexation to the Kingdom of Serbs, Croats and Slovenes (Yugoslavia).

Population
According to the 2001 census 33.3% of the population are Carinthian Slovenes.

References

Cities and towns in Völkermarkt District